San Pedro Rock is a rock formation and small island off Point San Pedro in Pacifica, California, in the San Francisco Bay Area's San Mateo County.

Access is only during low tide via a 1.2 mile path from Pacifica State Beach. At other times, access is blocked by private properties.

See also
 List of islands of California

References

Islands of the San Francisco Bay Area
Islands of Northern California
Islands of San Mateo County, California
Geology of San Mateo County, California
Rock formations of California
Uninhabited islands of California
Pacific islands of California